Budhhiman Tamang is a Nepalese politician, belonging to the Rastriya Prajatantra Party. He is currently serving as the member of the 2nd Federal Parliament of Nepal. In the 2022 Nepalese general election he was elected as a proportional representative from the indigenous people category.

References

Living people
Nepal MPs 2022–present
Nepal MPs 1999–2002
Nepal MPs 1994–1999
Year of birth missing (living people)